is a Japanese professional baseball Infielder for the Fukuoka SoftBank Hawks of Nippon Professional Baseball.

Early baseball career
Masuda participated in the 2rd grade summer the 98th Japanese High School Baseball Championship and  3rd grade summer the 99th Japanese High School Baseball Championship as a Center fielder of the Yokohama High School.

Professional career
On October 26, 2017, Masuda was drafted by the Fukuoka SoftBank Hawks in the 2017 Nippon Professional Baseball draft.

In the 2018 season, Masuda played in the Western League of NPB's minor leagues.

On September 28, 2019, Masuda debuted in the Pacific League against the Orix Buffaloes. In 2019, he played 2 games in the Pacific League. On November 27, Masuda underwent surgery on his right wrist.

In 2020, Masuda spent the season rehabilitating his right wrist and was unable to play in the Pacific League.

In 2021 season, Masuda never got a chance to play in the ｆirst league.

In 2022 season, Masuda was registered in the first team registration on July 17. He recorded his first hit that day, a home run, against the Chiba Lotte Marines. While his main players tested positive for COVID-19 and were out for rehabilitation, he was active, hitting the first two runs hit of the game on August 26 against the Hokkaido Nippon-Ham Fighters, And He was a member of the "Chikugo Hawks"  and supported the team until the main players returned. (a nickname given to the younger reserve players. Chikugo is the name of the place where the Hawks farm team is located.) He finished the regular season with a .256 batting average, one home run, and 6 RBI in 15 games.

International career
Masuda was selected for the Japan national baseball team at the 2014 15U Baseball World Cup and the Japan national baseball team at the 2017 U-18 Baseball World Cup.

References

External links

 Career statistics - NPB.jp
 33 Shu Masuda PLAYERS2022 - Fukuoka SoftBank Hawks Official site

1999 births
Living people
Fukuoka SoftBank Hawks players
Japanese baseball players
Nippon Professional Baseball infielders
Baseball people from Nagasaki Prefecture